Luanna Alzuguir (born 16 August 1985) is a Brazilian submission grappler and black belt Brazilian jiu-jitsu practitioner and coach. Alzuguir is a 5x world jiu-jitsu champion, an ADCC submission fighting world champion and a member of the IBJJF hall of fame, she is known as one of the main figures in women's jiu-jitsu history.

Biography 
Luanna Alzuguir Marton Moraes was born on 16 August 1985 in Sao Paulo, Brazil. Alzuguir started training Brazilian jiu-jitsu (BJJ) at age 9, competing for the first time in 1994. Alzuguir was awarded her black belt from Marco Barbosa in December 2007.

Brazilian Jiu-Jitsu competitive summary 
Main Achievements (Black Belt):
 IBJJF Hall of fame Athlete
 IBJJF #1 Ranked Athlete (2013)
 ADCC World Champion (2009)
 5 x IBJJF World Champion (2009 / 2010 / 2011 / 2012 / 2013)
 IBJJF World No-Gi Champion (2018)
 5 x IBJJF European Open Champion (2011 / 2013 / 2014)
 4 x IBJJF Pan Champion (2010 / 2011 / 2012)
 3 x CBJJ Brazilian Nationals Champion (2009 / 2013)
 3 x UAEJJF Abu Dhabi Pro Champion (2010 / 2011 / 2012)
 2 x CBJJE World Cup Champion (2007)

Personal life 
Alzuguir is married to five-time black belt IBJJF World champion Ana Carolina Vieira .

Notes

References 

Living people
People awarded a black belt in Brazilian jiu-jitsu
Brazilian practitioners of Brazilian jiu-jitsu
Female Brazilian jiu-jitsu practitioners
1985 births
World No-Gi Brazilian Jiu-Jitsu Championship medalists
Brazilian jiu-jitsu world champions (women)
ADCC Submission Fighting World Champions (women)
Brazilian submission wrestlers
21st-century Brazilian women
LGBT Brazilian jiu-jitsu practitioners
Brazilian LGBT sportspeople